The Hooper–Bowler–Hillstrom House was built in 1871 in Belle Plaine, Minnesota, United States, by Sandford A. Hooper, a local businessman and promoter of the town. In 1886 it conveyed to Samuel Bowler, a founder of the State Bank of Belle Plaine and lumber-yard owner. Bowler added a new kitchen, buttery, and a five-hole, two-story outhouse that is connected to the house via a skyway. He also added a copper-lined bathtub. When the Bowlers moved to Denver, Colorado in 1901, the clapboard frame house was sold to Alfred Hillstrom whose family lived in the house until it was purchased in 1975 by the town's Historical Society. It is now owned by the city of Belle Plaine and is open to the public. Current furnishings include three periods-1850s and 1860s, Victorian, and early 1900s.

Additional features include a well-pump in the kitchen, a wood stove, and a large carriage stone on the front lawn, which acted as a step for ascending into or descending from carriages. Surviving outbuildings include a wood shed used to store coal and wood to fuel the stoves in the house and a brick smoke house. Furnishing include a "courting chair" in which young couples would sit back-to-back.

The home has a low-pitched roof and central chimneys; it is adorned with a long, covered front porch and is specially decorated for Christmas. In addition to the winter holiday, the home is open to the public in the summer. Visitors may see the distinctive outhouse, but may not use it. Similar to other two-story outhouses, the waste from the upper level flows behind a false wall in the lower level.

References

External links

Hooper-Bowler-Hillstrom House - City of Belle Plaine

Historic house museums in Minnesota
Houses completed in 1871
Houses in Scott County, Minnesota
Houses on the National Register of Historic Places in Minnesota
Museums in Scott County, Minnesota
National Register of Historic Places in Scott County, Minnesota